The North American Under 21 World Qualifier (usually referred to as the U.S. Under 21 Championship) is an annual speedway event held each year to qualify for a spot in the Qualifying Round of the World Under 21 Championships since 2003. The current US Champion is Bryce Starks.

Age Limits 
The minimum age of a rider to compete is 16 years of age (starting on the date of the rider's birthday). The maximum age is 21 years of age (finishing at the end of the year in which the rider celebrates his 21st birthday).

Previous Winner

See also 
 United States national speedway team

References and notes 

 
Speedway in the United States